Albert Henze (7 August 1894 – 31 March 1979) was a general who commanded several divisions in the Wehrmacht of Nazi Germany during World War II. He was a recipient of the Knight's Cross of the Iron Cross with Oak Leaves. Henze surrendered to the Soviet forces in the Courland Pocket and was held as a war criminal in the Soviet Union until 1955.

Awards and decorations
 Iron Cross (1914) 2nd Class (27 July 1916) & 1st Class (27 January 1918) 
 Clasp to the Iron Cross (1939) 2nd Class (2 October 1939) & 1st Class (12 July 1940)
 Honour Roll Clasp of the Army (18 August 1943)
 German Cross in Gold on 2 March 1943 as Oberst in Panzergrenadier-Regiment 110
 Knight's Cross of the Iron Cross with Oak Leaves
 Knight's Cross on 15 January 1944 as Oberst and commander of Panzergrenadier-Regiment 110
 709th Oak Leaves on 21 January 1945 as Generalmajor and commander of Gruppe Henze (FeldDiv 21 (L))

References

Citations

Bibliography

 
 
 

1894 births
1979 deaths
People from Kirchhain
Lieutenant generals of the German Army (Wehrmacht)
German Army personnel of World War I
Recipients of the Gold German Cross
Recipients of the Knight's Cross of the Iron Cross with Oak Leaves
German prisoners of war in World War II held by the Soviet Union
People from Hesse-Nassau
Recipients of the clasp to the Iron Cross, 1st class
Officers Crosses of the Order of Merit of the Federal Republic of Germany
Military personnel from Hesse